Passeig de Lluís Companys is a promenade in the Ciutat Vella and Eixample districts of Barcelona, Catalonia, Spain, and can be seen as an extension of Passeig de Sant Joan. It was named after President Lluís Companys, who was executed in 1940. It starts in Arc de Triomf and ends in Parc de la Ciutadella, on Carrer de Pujades.

Former names
The original Cerdà plan originally listed it as Núm. 35, and was later renamed to Salón de Víctor Pradera, Fermín Galán and Salón de San Juan, or Saló de Sant Joan in Catalan. In 1979 the current name was approved by the city council.

Buildings and monuments
Arc de Triomf, by Josep Vilaseca i Casanovas
Tribunal Superior de Justícia de Catalunya, a monumental building in a highly eclectic style, by Enric Sagnier and Josep Domènech Estapà.

Personatges del Saló de Sant Joan
In 1883, the Barcelona city council approved the inauguration of eight sculptures commemorating eight important men in the history of Catalonia. Originally, these were: Wilfred the Hairy, Roger of Lauria, Bernat Desclot, Rafael Casanova, Ramon Berenguer I, Pere Albert, Antoni Viladomat and Jaume Fabre. They were inaugurated in 1888 for the Barcelona Universal Exposition. Casanova's monument was moved to Ronda Sant Pere in 1917 and replaced by a new one dedicated to Pau Claris, made by Rafael Atché. However, all but the Roger de Llúria and Viladomat statues were removed in 1937, and the Pau Claris monument, concealed in a warehouse for decades, was reinaugurated in 1977.

Other sculptures
Lluís Companys monument (1998) by Francisco López Hernández. Has the inscription Catalonia and freedom are the same thing: where freedom lives, there my homeland is. A young girl, Conxita Julià, friend of Companys, poet later on, is the main subject of the sculpture.
Francesc Rius i Taulet monument (1901) by Manuel Fuxà
Pere Vila Codina monument (1932) by Josep Dunyach.

Transport

Metro
Arc de Triomf (L1)

Bus
Line 39 Barceloneta - Horta
Line 40 Port Vell - Trinitat Vella
Line 41 Pl. Francesc Macià - Diagonal Mar
Line 42 Pl. Catalunya - Santa Coloma
Line 51 Pla de Palau - Ciutat Meridiana
Line 141 Av. Mistral - Barri del Besòs
Line B25 Barcelona (Rda. Sant Pere) - Badalona (B. Pomar)

Gallery

See also
Passeig de Sant Joan
Parc de la Ciutadella
List of streets and squares in Eixample
Urban planning of Barcelona

External links
Monuments in Passeig de Lluís Companys

Streets in Barcelona
Ciutat Vella
Eixample